Winners of the Deadly Awards 1997.The awards were an annual celebration of Australian Aboriginal and Torres Strait Islander achievement in music, sport, entertainment and community.

Music
Outstanding Contribution to Aboriginal Music: Jimmy Little
Most Promising New Talent: Aim 4 More
Male Artist of the Year: Archie Roach
Female Artist of the Year: Maroochy Barambah
Single Release of the Year: Ignorance Is Bliss, Tiddas
Album Release of the Year: True Believer, Troy Cassar-Daley
Band of the Year: Yothu Yindi

Arts
Excellence in Film or Theatrical Score: Fish by David Page

Community
Aboriginal Broadcaster of the Year: Tiga Bayles, Radio 4AAA

External links
1997 winners at The Deadlys 

The Deadly Awards
1997 music awards
1997 in Australian music
Indigenous Australia-related lists